Kunciran–Serpong Toll Road is a toll road, which runs from Kunciran to Serpong in Greater Jakarta, Indonesia. This toll road is part of the Jakarta Outer Ring Road 2 network that will connect Soekarno-Hatta International Airport to Cilincing. The toll is connected to the Jakarta–Tangerang Toll Road, Cengkareng–Batu Ceper–Kunciran Toll Road, Jakarta–Serpong Toll Road, and Cinere–Serpong Toll Road.

Section 1 runs from Kunciran to Parigi, and section 2, from Parigi to Serpong. The toll road was officially inaugurated by President Joko Widodo on 6 December, 2019.

Exits

See also

Trans-Java toll road

References

Buildings and structures in Jakarta
Toll roads in Indonesia
Transport in Jakarta
Transport in Banten